Scrambled eggs is a dish made from eggs (usually chicken eggs) stirred, whipped, or beaten together while being gently heated, typically with salt, butter, oil, and sometimes other ingredients.

History
The scrambling of eggs is an ancient technique. However, the earliest documented recipe for scrambled eggs was in the 14th-century Italian cookbook Libro Della Cucina.

Preparation
Only eggs are necessary to make scrambled eggs, but salt, water, milk, chives, cream, crème fraîche, sour cream, or grated cheese may be added. The eggs are cracked into a bowl with some salt and pepper, and the mixture is stirred or whisked: alternatively, the eggs are cracked directly into a hot pan or skillet, and the whites and yolks stirred together as they cook. Recipes disagree on whether milk, cream, or water should be added.

The mixture can be poured into a hot pan containing melted butter or oil, where it starts coagulating. The heat is turned down and the eggs are stirred as they cook. This creates small, soft curds of egg. A thin pan is preferable to prevent browning. With continuous stirring, and not allowing the eggs to stick to the pan, the eggs themselves will maintain the pan temperature at about the boiling point of water, until they coagulate.

Once the liquid has mostly set, additional ingredients such as ham, herbs, cheese, or cream may be folded in over low heat until incorporated. The eggs are usually slightly undercooked when removed from heat since the eggs will continue to set. If any liquid is seeping from the eggs (syneresis), this is a sign of undercooking, overcooking, or adding undercooked high-moisture vegetables.

Scrambled eggs can be cooked in a microwave oven, and can also be prepared using sous-vide cooking, which gives the traditional smooth creamy texture and requires only occasionally mixing during cooking. Another technique for cooking creamy scrambled eggs is to pipe steam into eggs with butter via a steam wand (as found on an espresso machine).

Variations

 Buttered eggs – a typically English dish, often mentioned in 19th and early 20th-century literature; additional butter is melted and stirred into the egg mixture before cooking.
 Egg bhurji – Indian variant of scrambled eggs. Additions include onions, green chili, chopped ginger, turmeric powder, and chopped tomatoes. Sprinkled with chopped green coriander and eaten with roti. Another variant of egg bhurji is the Parsi akuri.
 Eggs frizzle – scrambled egg dish made with chipped beef "frizzled" in butter before eggs are added to the pan and scrambled. To make a variation called "Eggs a la Caracas" the beef is frizzled with tomatoes, spices, and grated cheese.
 In American style, the eggs are scooped in towards the middle of the pan as they set, giving larger curds.
 In British style, the scrambled eggs are stirred thoroughly during cooking to give a soft, fine texture.
 In the classic French cooking method, Escoffier describes using a double boiler as the heating source, which does not need adjustment as the direct heating method would. The eggs are directly placed in the cooker and mixed during the heating and not before. Cooking by this method prevents the eggs from browning while being cooked and gives aerated and creamy scrambled eggs. This method was used in the "old classical kitchen" and guarantees the eggs are always cooked perfectly; it is, however, more time-consuming than the modern skillet method, taking up to 40 minutes to ensure perfect quality.
 Jaz maz [جظ مظ] – a Syrian variant of scrambled eggs made by first adding some oil, butter or ghee and frying some chopped tomatoes and onions. After, you add the eggs and spices (usually salt, pepper, red pepper powder, and sometimes the spice mix 'sabaa baharat'. It is eaten with the traditional Syrian bread Khubz. It is typically eaten as breakfast but can be a lunch or dinner dish too.
 Migas – a Tex-Mex dish (not to be confused with the Iberian dish of the same name) consisting of scrambled eggs augmented with strips of corn tortilla, to which vegetables and meat may be added.
 Onions and scrambled eggs – another variant of scrambled eggs eaten in the Philippines. The onions are either fried first then the egg mixture is poured over them to cook, or the onions are mixed with the egg mixture and then poured over the pan.
 Parrot eggs ("Perico" in Spanish) is a dish in Venezuelan cuisine and Colombian cuisine prepared with scrambled eggs, butter, sautéed diced onions, and tomatoes. White cheese is also sometimes used.
 Poqui poqui – a Filipino dish consisting of grilled eggplants with sauteed garlic, tomatoes, and shallots and scrambled eggs.
 Scotch woodcock – British variant of scrambled eggs, served over toast that has been spread with Gentleman's Relish.
 Scrambled eggs à l'américaine – with pan-fried smoked bacon, garnished with slices of broiled bacon and small grilled tomato halves.
 Scrambled eggs à l'arlésienne – with zucchini (courgette) pulp and a concentrated garlic-flavored tomato fondue served in hollowed-out courgettes and sprinkled with Parmesan cheese.
 Scrambled eggs with digüeñes – a variation from Chilean cuisine in which the eggs are fried together with the native fungus Cyttaria espinosae, or sometimes spinach.
 Scrambled eggs with sucuk or pastırma; sucuklu yumurta and pastırmalı yumurta respectively – scrambled eggs are mixed with Turkish beef sausages, or dried cured beef. It is cooked in a sahan (a shallow dish) with butter or olive oil. Some tomato can be added. In Turkey and Egypt it is eaten regularly for breakfast.
 Sirabij – scrambled eggs with chopped and fried garlic leaves, prepared in the cuisines of the Iranian maritime (Caspian) provinces of Mazandaran and Gilan.
 Soy scrambled eggs – mixed with soy sauce and often eaten with congee.
 Stir-fried tomato and scrambled eggs – a very common main course in China. Fry the eggs first, add the cut tomatoes, and then mix the eggs and ketchup. It is inexpensive and quickly and easily prepared, so is a favourite among teens and university students. This is also eaten in the Philippines.
 The dish is called "fried eggs" in Nigeria. The mai shai stalls cook scrambled eggs to the point of being heavily crisp.

Serving styles

Classical haute cuisine preparation calls for serving scrambled eggs in a deep silver dish.  They can also be presented in small croustades made from hollowed-out brioche or tartlets. When eaten for breakfast, scrambled eggs often accompany toast, bacon, smoked salmon, hash browns, maize, pancakes, ham or sausages. Popular condiments served with scrambled eggs include ketchup, hot sauce, and Worcestershire sauce.

See also
 Egg as food
 
 Fried egg
 Ham and eggs
 List of brunch foods
 List of egg dishes
 Poached egg

Notes

References
Escoffier, Georges Auguste. Escoffier: The Complete Guide to the Art of Modern Cookery. Translated by H. L. Cracknell and R.J. Kaufmann. New York: John Wiley and Sons, 2002
FoodMayhem.com. Chef Jody Williams Shows Me How to Steam Scramble Eggs. New York: FoodMayhem.com, 2009.
McGee, Harold. On Food and Cooking: The Science and Lore of the Kitchen. New York: Scribner, 2004.
Robuchon, Joël, Members of the Gastronomic Committee. Larousse Gastronomique. New York: Clarkson Potter/Publishers, 2001.

External links
 

Egg dishes
Articles containing video clips